Lucidella plicatula is a species of land snail with an operculum, terrestrial gastropod mollusk in the family Helicinidae.

Distribution
Distribution of Lucidella plicatula include West Indies.

References

External links 
 http://www.discoverlife.org/mp/20q?search=Lucidella+plicatula&guide=Molluscs

Helicinidae